Propsocus pulchripennis is a species of damp barklouse in the family Elipsocidae. It is found in Africa, Australia, Europe and Northern Asia (excluding China), Central America, North America, Oceania, and South America.

References

Elipsocidae
Articles created by Qbugbot
Insects described in 1899